Ely Township is a civil township of Marquette County in the U.S. state of Michigan. The population was 1,900 at the 2020 census.

Communities 
 Clarksburg was settled in 1862 along the Escanaba River.  The Michigan Iron Company had a blast furnace here.  It was platted in 1881.  The post office closed in 1894.
 Greenwood is an unincorporated community on US 41/M-28 approximately three miles west of Ishpeming. Greenwood was a station on the Duluth, South Shore and Atlantic Railway and was first platted in 1865. It was the site of the blast furnaces of the Michigan Iron Company and was first known as "Greenwood Furnace". A post office with that name operated from March 1867 until October 1875, the year the furnaces were closed.
 South Greenwood is an unincorporated community approximately one mile south of US 41/M-28 at  The Greenwood Station on Duluth, South Shore and Atlantic Railway was located here..
 Champion is a community to the west and the Champion ZIP code 49814 serves portions of western and northern Ely Township.
 Snowville is an unincorporated community in the township

Geography

Highways
 passes east–west through the northern portion of the township.

Climate
Clarksburg has a snowy humid continental climate (Dfb) bordering relatively closely on a subarctic climate (Dfc), and is the coldest settlement in all of the state of Michigan with an average yearly mean of 38.2 °F (3.4 °C). Summers are pleasant albeit rainy, with warm to hot daytime temperatures along with cooler nights. Summer also is the wettest time of the year. Springs and Autumns can be highly variable but Springs tend to be cooler and more snowier. Winters are severely long and cold for the lower 48, as well as being very snowy, with annual snowfall averaging over 120 inches (305 cm) each year, due to lake-effect snow. Winters usually last 5 – 6 months depending on the severity of the winter with milder days being sprinkled in on both ends of the season. The average growing season is likely the shortest in the state of Michigan, with just 88 growing days, lasting from June 12 to September 8, though frosts have been recorded during all months of the year, including all of the summer months. Diurnal temperature range is relatively high year round, though it is higher during Spring and Summer.

Record high: 96 °F (35.6 °C) - recorded on July 16, 2006 & August 1, 2006

Record low: -38 °F (-38.9 °C) - recorded on February 24, 2015

Highest minimum: 71 °F (21.7 °C) - recorded on August 21, 2003

Lowest maximum: -8 °F (-22.2 °C) - recorded on February 5, 2007

Highest daily snowfall: 21 inches (53.3 cm) - recorded on December 13, 2004

Highest snow depth: 60 inches (152.4 cm) - recorded on February 24 & 25, 2019

Demographics
As of the census of 2000, there were 2,010 people, 726 households, and 564 families residing in the township.  The population density was 14.6 per square mile (5.6/km2).  There were 1,105 housing units at an average density of 8.0 per square mile (3.1/km2).  The racial makeup of the township was 98.71% White, 0.10% African American, 0.65% Native American, 0.15% Asian, and 0.40% from two or more races. Hispanic or Latino of any race were 0.25% of the population.

There were 726 households, out of which 34.6% had children under the age of 18 living with them, 68.3% were married couples living together, 5.1% had a female householder with no husband present, and 22.3% were non-families. 18.5% of all households were made up of individuals, and 5.4% had someone living alone who was 65 years of age or older.  The average household size was 2.77 and the average family size was 3.16.

In the township the population was spread out, with 27.8% under the age of 18, 8.7% from 18 to 24, 28.4% from 25 to 44, 27.4% from 45 to 64, and 7.8% who were 65 years of age or older.  The median age was 37 years. For every 100 females, there were 106.2 males.  For every 100 females age 18 and over, there were 107.1 males.

The median income for a household in the township was $42,326, and the median income for a family was $46,739. Males had a median income of $36,786 versus $22,000 for females. The per capita income for the township was $16,901.  About 2.7% of families and 5.1% of the population were below the poverty line, including 5.9% of those under age 18 and 4.4% of those age 65 or over.

References

Notes

Sources

Townships in Marquette County, Michigan
Townships in Michigan